All About Adam is a Filipino television series about four young men who live together in one house and deal with their respective careers. Jeremy, Drew, Josh and Paulo maneuver their lives as each experiences ambition, betrayal, secrecy, money, fame, hot beautiful women and sex.

Premise

In early 2010, writer/producer/director Julius Roden set a meeting with independent film artists Jude Faith and Chris Lucas. The intention was to create a boy band, but the focus soon shifted to the creation of a new television series. Roden thought about making a television movie about five bachelors with different careers, inspired by the early 1990s hit Filipino sitcom Palibhasa Lalake.  However, the producer thought it would be better to create an extended television series rather than a single movie.

Roden proposed the title "Adam's Apple", but Faith and Lucas did not think the audience would take that title seriously. Thus, "Adam's Crib" was suggested. Then, followed "Hot Shots", then "Men's Locker", "Men's Secret", "Men's Room", "Men's CR" and they ended up with "Adam's Crib".

Nevertheless, Julius Roden was still not happy with it. He thought it sounded like the Filipino rock band "Barbie's Cradle". So he finally changed it to "All About Adam".

The auditions began and several actors tried to get lead parts. The starring role was first offered to Victor Aliwalas but the actor's manager didn't allow him due to conflict in schedules. Then, it was offered to Joem Bascon. However, he also was unavailable.

Finally, Roden found Migui Moreno and filming for the pilot began.

Synopsis
In the pilot episode, Josh and Jeremy are introduced as underground heavy metal musicians hoping to get a record deal from a big time producer while Paulo and Drew get involved with a mysterious vixen and her connection to the suicide case of Christian Jacob that Sgt. Yoga Sabarita and Inspector Laura Marasigan are investigating.

The two flamboyant Adams deny their sexual engagement with the mysterious vixen, but the police officers remained skeptical.

Cast
 Migui Moreno
Moreno is an actor in television, films, theater and commercials. He is a former member of the 1990s Filipino boy band Idolzone, a former member of the That's Entertainment cast, and was the star of Carlo J. Caparas' Kroko: Takas Sa Zoo, which was shown at the same network (IBC-13). He is also known for his performances in Gantimpala Theater.

In All About Adam, Moreno is the funny, wild and sexy Paulo Morales. He is the "Pinoy cowboy" and he loves hot beautiful women.

Philipp Dunkel

Dunkel was rejected twice by Roden in the auditions but filming was about to start and still, no actor was available. On his third audition and screen test, the lead vocalist of the heavy metal underground band United By Fate made it.  In All About Adam, the half-Filipino half-German actor/musician is Jeremy Cabrera.

Jeffrey Canlas
Canlas is the vocalist of the alternative rock band Ethigma. Like Dunkel, Jeffrey's band used to be heavy metal but change of directions led their music to a different genre. He had met previously met Adam producer Roden in 2009 at a recording studio.  When it came time to cast Adam, Roden sought out Canlas to be part of the cast.

In All About Adam, Canlas plays Josh Jimenez, the best friend of Jeremy Cabrera and vocalist of their rock band.

Michael Ignacio
Ignacio was chosen by Roden during the cyber audition of All About Adam. He landed the part of Drew Smith - a gym instructor and the less sex party animal version of Paulo Morales. Despite of being a registered nurse, Michael opted for the world of entertainment and he had performed in several theatrical productions such as director Tony Espejo's Beauty And The Beast, in which he played the character Gaston.

Karlo Manalo

Originally chosen by Roden to play Drew Smith in the television movie of All About Adam. But due to conflicts in filming schedules, he played the brief and groundbreaking role of an HIV victim named Christian Jacob. Before joining All About Adam, Karlo Manalo became very controversial when Vice Ganda  hit on him and went tumbling backward on national television in 2009 on a Filipino talent show titled Showtime. His Adonis charming looks caught the attention of the host/judge. Manalo was then tagged as The Man who made Vice Ganda go GaGa.

Martin Mendoza
Mendoza joins the cast of All About Adam the series in its first full season. He plays Archie Sandoval, an aspiring writer/journalist. However, because of his boyish looks and a body like a ramp model, most people in newspaper and magazine companies never take him seriously.

References

See also
List of programs broadcast by Intercontinental Broadcasting Corporation
List of programs previously broadcast by Intercontinental Broadcasting Corporation

Philippine drama television series
Intercontinental Broadcasting Corporation original programming
Filipino-language television shows